António da Silva Alves Barbosa (24 December 1931 – 29 September 2018), commonly known as Alves Barbosa, was a Portuguese professional road cyclist. He won the Volta a Portugal in 1951, 1956 and 1958, placing third in 1955, and rode the Tour de France from 1956 until 1958 and again in 1960. He also won a stage of the 1961 Vuelta a España.

Major results

1950
 1st  Junior National Road Race Championships
1951
 1st  Overall Volta a Portugal
1st Prologue & Stages 2 & 3
1952
 1st Prova Ciclística 9 de Julho
 1st Stage 9 Tour du Maroc
1954
 1st  National Road Race Championships
1955
 1st Prova Ciclística 9 de Julho
 1st Stages 4, 7, 8b, 9, 10 & 12a Volta a Portugal
1956
 1st  National Road Race Championships
 1st  Overall Volta a Portugal
1st Stages 2a, 4a, 7, 8b, 9b, 10b, 12, 14 & 15
 8th Overall Four Days of Dunkirk
 10th Overall Tour de France
1958
 1st  Overall Volta a Portugal
1st Stages 1b, 8, 12, 17, 21, 22a & 23
1959
 1st Stages 5a, 5b (TTT), 13, 14, 15a, 16a & 19 Volta a Portugal
1960
 1st Stages 1 & 6 Tour du Maroc
 9th Overall Vuelta a Andalucía
1961
 1st Stage 9 Vuelta a España
 8th Overall Vuelta a Andalucía
1st Stage 4

References

External links
 

1931 births
2018 deaths
Portuguese male cyclists
People from Figueira da Foz
Volta a Portugal winners
Portuguese Vuelta a España stage winners
S.L. Benfica (cycling)
Sportspeople from Coimbra District